Aechmea streptocalycoides is a species of flowering plant in the genus Aechmea. This species is native to Peru and Ecuador.

References

streptocalycoides
Flora of Ecuador
Flora of Peru
Plants described in 1985